Binocular rivalry is a visual phenomenon wherein one experiences alternating perceptions due to the occurrence of different stimuli presented to the corresponding retinal regions of the two eyes and their competition for perceptual dominance.

As they compete, alternations between stimuli typically occur after a few seconds of steady vision. Neuroscientists have used binocular rivalry as a means to test neural responses and have found that the time intervals for these responses correlate with the alternations in perceptual dominance.

A famous example of the phenomenon as described by Giambattista della Porta in the sixteenth-century, was to try reading two pages, each from a different book. The reader is to train an eye on each page and attempt to read one without disruption from the other eye.

However, the rivalry is not always triggered; sometimes the stimuli blend together in a superposition of the original two stimuli or they fuse into a stable average. The rivalry is easily triggered by factors such as a difference in colour or brightness between the two stimuli, velocity, pattern and low-light settings.

Binocular rivalry as a quantum formalism was first proposed by Efstratios Manousakis in his paper Quantum Formalism to Describe Binocular Rivalry in which he theorizes a mathematical description of the increase in dominance duration in binocular rivalry to make quantum predictions in which the observer affects the outcome for the distribution of perceptual alteration in time.

Rationale 
The study of binocular rivalry as a quantum formalism is here based on Neumann’s quantum theory of measurement and conscious observation. According to his theory, conscious events coincide with quantum wave "collapses." This occurs when the event is observed, because it solidifies the result, and affects the neural correlates of the brain state, which is in agreement with calculating the probability distributions of dominance duration of the opposing states in binocular rivalry.

The increase in dominance duration in binocular rivalry upon stimuli disruption yields testable predictions for the distribution of perceptual alteration in time. It is argued that the mathematics of quantum theory may describe certain aspects of conscious experience. For the purpose of this study, this idea is applied in order to describe mental experience of the observer undergoing binocular rivalry, rather than how the brain operates during the process.

The nature of this study is significant in exploring the quantitative connection of the formalism of quantum theory with consciousness by applying the formation to psycho-physical phenomenon of binocular rivalry. Studying this connection is important because it can be useful in understanding the role of the central nervous system and its processes in consciousness and qualia. Qualia is the phenomenon of consciousness experience and a subject of much interest in both science and philosophy, which may be able to be explained by quantum theory in this study.

Formulation 

In his original paper, Manousakis made the argument linking the realization of conscious events with the collapses of particles represented by the wave function. Supposing that the state of consciousness during binocular rivalry can be modelled by the following equation for a situation of n-indeterminate states,

with the vector |ψ> representing the complete potential state in Hilbert space, co-efficients ci for i = 1, … , n numbers in the complex plane related to the probability of each corresponding vector and each vector |i> representing each n-indeterminate state forming an orthogonal basis spanning |i>.

An operator is required to act upon the total potential state to actualize one of the n-indeterminate states. During binocular rivalry, this operator is the consciousness. The paper then argues that the consciousness can only perceive change since it is due to the continual influx of light reflecting off an object that causes new neurotransmitters to fire and activate the Neural Correlates of Consciousness (NCC) to be able to create an image in the brain. So, the operator used when perceiving an object moving in space is equivalent to the Del operator ∇ = (∂x, ∂y, ∂z) and the operator used when perceiving a change in time is equivalent to ∂t.

Considering the time evolution of the vector |ψ>, define vectors |i>t to be a basis for all time evolution states of |ψ>. Let  be a Hermitian operator acting on |i> giving eigenvalues ωi such that: . So expanding |ψ> using the Fourier series yields,

And using the definitions of |ψ> and  reduces the previous equation to,  which is equivalent to the following time evolution equation:

This equation describing the cognitive process resembles the general time-dependent Schrödinger equation but notice that Planck’s constant is not involved with this equation as it is with the one modelling quantum mechanics.

Model Comparisons with Previous Experiments 
The mathematical model proposed by Manousakis has been correlated with past empirical data pertaining to binocular rivalry. Specifically, work describing the observed probability distribution of dominance duration (PDDD) of rival states in binocular rivalry fits well with the proposed formulation when applied to a two state system. Simply put, binocular rivalry can be regarded as a system in which there is some probability of seeing either state, and the relative probabilities of the two oscillate. The probability of viewing one rival state is high while the other is low, and after some time, the states switch—Manousakis attributes the psychophysical and neuronal data from this phenomenon to the hypothesized formulation.  Furthermore, the present model is able to produce testable predictions for the distribution of dominance duration when a stimulus has periodically been removed.

Probability Distribution of Dominance Duration 
Perceptual state "switching" in binocular rivalry has been extensively studied in electrophysiological research. Data from these studies have determined the firing rates of neurons before, during, and after which the brain has "switched" between equal strength stimuli. Here, consciousness is determined through the analysis of retinal eye movements in conjunction with neuronal firing rates.

An object stimulus will eventually fade from our consciousness if the retina is continually held constant relative to the object; striate‐cortex neurons are direction selective and will only respond to motion in this scenario. In order to consciously fixate on a stagnant object, the retina moves by means of micro‐saccadic motion. Microsaccades are thus indicative of changes in rivalry state, or can prolong the dominance of the currently dominant image—the outcome is largely influenced by the extent or timing of the saccades.  When the retina does not undergo these motions (or is held constant), the stimulus eventually fades from consciousness and becomes a mixture of all potential outcomes. In the quantum interpretation of this event, it is assumed that an operation occurring in higher regions of the brain is the observing operation. Through microsaccadic motion, the observing operation changes the state of potential consciousness and compares this state before the motion in order to cause the observation and collapse. Hence, recordings of neuronal activity during microsaccadic measurements have provided useful insight in understanding the distribution of dominance duration in binocular rivalry, and such data has been compared to predictions made by Manousakis' quantum model. 

In macaque monkeys, measurements of microsaccadic eye movements and neuronal cell activity in the striate cortex have revealed an average frequency by which a precise duration (~0.5 seconds) of microsaccadic motion lead to a firing of a striate cortex neuron (indicating conscious motion perception). The study revealed various parameters which controlled the rate of neuron firing, which were subsequently compared with different qualitative regimes of the quantum model. A PDDD of rivalry states was obtained by inputting the empirically derived time-scale durations of the microsaccades and oscillatory parameters into the proposed formulation. The generated distribution of perceptual state‐switching carried the same graphical shape as the data collected from experiments performed by Levelt (image, right).

In another experiment involving a human subject under the influence of hallucinogenic drugs (LSD), the oscillatory behaviour of the distribution of dominance duration was recorded. Similar to the previous study, Manousakis' model was able to accurately predict the frequency by which the subject was able to switch between rivalry states given the neuronal hindering effects of the drug.

Periodic Removal of Stimulus 
In binocular rivalry experiments in which the stimulus is periodically removed, a distribution delineating the perceptual alterations as a function of time can be predicted using the present model. Moreover, the proposed theory explains and predicts another observed phenomenon; namely, that if the stimuli in binocular rivalry are removed, the frequency of switching is reduced.

If the external process which presents the two potential states to awareness is interrupted (by means of removing the stimulus), the state of potential consciousness will remain on the most recently collapsed visual percept. Furthermore, since the external stimulation of the rival state has been halted, alterations of the perceptual states should not occur since the likelihood associated with the other percept has been removed. Thus, once a new stimulation where both states are reintroduced to awareness, evolution of the state of potential consciousness begins with the most previously collapsed state. In effect, the state of potential consciousness will collapse again in the previously collapsed state with a higher probability. It can be therefore deduced that when the process of introducing a stimulus to awareness is interrupted, the time evolution of the state of potential consciousness is halted, and the frequency of switching states after presenting the stimuli again is significantly reduced. These predications are consistent with the previous works of Brascamp et al., where it was shown that the reversal frequency of rival states decreases by increasing blank (stimulus removal) intervals.

The role of attention in this model is of noteworthy interest, as recent research has shown that attention can bias the initial selection of state in binocular rivalry toward the attended state. In the context of the quantum model, attention is postulated to be the voluntary or involuntary preparation of the state of potential consciousness with increased likelihood. Consequently, this heightened probability for one state causes biased preferences for a certain event to occur in one's consciousness.

Criticisms 

Precisely why quantum mechanics is applied to this biological phenomenon is left amply unaccounted for in the proposed model. This approach has been generally criticized for simply employing correlative math which happens to work with a poorly understood mental mechanism and quantum mechanical effects. Indeed, the model that is used produces a distribution of state switching durations, but the approach appears to be more of a fit of the data rather than a prediction. In lieu of predicting the outcomes, the parameters selected for the model were chosen to result in the best possible fitted relationship between the model's distribution and those found in the aforementioned psychological experiments. Further to this, there are several criticisms for the mathematical modelling attempts of binocular rivalry from a quantum mechanical point of view, revolving around the argument that the mixed state should be considered as a separate entity in the modelling, and not as transitional between two dominant states.

Weaknesses in PDDD Estimates 
Efstratios Manousakis in 2009 used the quantum formalism to describe what happens to the abstract mental processes that occur during perception, or more simply put, the conscious experience. Manousakis developed the observed probability distribution of dominance durations (PDDD), which describes the duration in which a particular state is dominant. Paraan and colleagues suggest that his methods in generating PDDD actually weakens one of the important components of conscious perception during binocular rivalry; in particular, they are referring to the mixed state in which there is a mixed dominance. He states that there is plenty of evidence in the literature which showcase the importance of these mixed states, and so should not be ignored. Including these mixed states actually causes quite a lot of complications and so the model generated by Manousakis ignores them, treating the two binocular rivalry states as two quantum states. Paraan continues to argue that the quantum states in Manousakis’ model are purely symbolic and only represents the perception but are not similar in any way. As a result, it would not be a problem adding a third state to represent the mixed state, as long as corresponding experimental data can be obtained. The exclusion of the mixed state in Manousakis’ model may be due to the assumption that the mixed state is transitional, bridging two dominance states. Paraan et al. believe that the mixed state actually can be the dominant state, albeit dominating in a random fashion, however as mentioned previously, should be represented as a separate state.

Considering Indeterminate Perception 
Conte and colleagues similarly modelled mental states following quantum mechanics while participants were asked to observe ambiguous figures. Although similar to Manousakis’ model, they consider the indeterminate perception (a patient isn’t sure about the shape)  which resembles the mixed state. Although it is included in the model, it is represented as a wave-function, not as a third state as Paraan et al. suggested for the Manousakis model. Therefore, they argue that this is an inaccurate representation of indeterminate perception as it would mean the two states are superimposed onto each other; in actuality it is another activation of neural correlates of consciousness that is corresponding to the indeterminate position state and should be treated as such. Really it must be mentioned that the first approach to discuss Consciousness and Quantum Interference is due to C.H. Woo. This author discussed such team in a celebrated paper in 1981 and published on Foundations of Physics vol.11, Nos11/12,1981. He considered the wave function superimposed in a two states as in paper of Conte et al.

A general criticism for using quantum mechanics to explain brain functions like binocular rivalry is the disconnect from the ‘machinery’ available. Where and how quantum mechanical phenomena would interact within the brain to create consciousness or other functions is not yet precisely defined and as a result not yet testable.

Applications 
The paper by Andrew J. Marlow illustrates a potential quantum approach to anorexia nervosa. There are many theories that contribute to possibilities in which a quantum explanation may contribute to this mental illness. Theories such as the Orch OR theory, the Thermofield Brain Dynamics theory and more which further incorporate other theories work to formulate possible applications to anorexia nervosa.

This article makes a proposition based on a perceptive view. When asking the question "am I fat?" the answer is either yes or no, in terms of bits relative to quantum bits, respectively. When perceived in relation to quantum bits the answer can be both yes and no, taking into consideration the multitude of corresponding amplitudes. Traditionally, when one looks at a mirror and they see their reflection, and they are fat, the answer to that above question, will be yes. However, in the unconscious quantum logic, the answer is both yes and no, where the answers are superposed. The unconscious object relation of anorexia nervosa affect the probability amplitudes of the logical proposition "I am fat" . There is essentially a disruption to the perception. The Orch OR theory proposes that the human consciousness can be explained through "object reduction" which is a function by which the brain uses "microtubules" in the neurons to computate and regulate neural operations. Tubulins, existing as a subunit of microtubules, are related by quantum superposition and perform functions like that of a quantum computer. Upon disruption or poor development of these formulations, the normal perception is lost. Which leads to one of the coinciding theories where there is a "failure to develop" as a child, learning to recognize self from others and their own body parts. The pre-anorexic child is unable to develop a normal sense of self that is appropriately linked with their psychic experience, thereby introjecting a "false self". With this disconnect having occurred, the child will now derive their self-perception from the wants and desires of others around them. Due to this assimilation of an identity not their own, there has been the term coined "the selflessness of anorexia". Obedience and desire to please others is why the pre-anorexic child is often described as "the good child that always listens". Due to this development that when the child grows up to be independent and not knowing how to have and satisfy their own needs, they resort to self-starvation.

References

Further reading 

  The first quantum mechanical argument put forth to explain binocular rivalry. Ideas from this article are explained and argued throughout the page; especially in the Formulation section.
  Arguments made by Paraan and colleagues that models using quantum mechanics to explain binocular rivalry are incomplete. They argue that the mixed state is either missing or misrepresented in the model, undermining their accuracy.
  Conte and colleagues also generated a model to describe binocular rivalry, and they included the mixed state into their calculations. Paraan argues that although it was included, it was incorrectly represented and therefore inaccurate. 
  The author further argues that because it is unknown where in the brain quantum mechanical functions would interact to create consciousness, it cannot be tested. As a result, there is no direct evidence for this occurrence.

Visual perception
Binocular rivalry